Metaplastes pulchripennis, common name Italian ornate bush-cricket, is a species of 'katydids crickets' belonging to the family Tettigoniidae subfamily Phaneropterinae.

Distribution and habitat
This species is present in mainland of Italy, in northern Sardinia, in Corsica, in northern Sicily and in northeastern Spain. It mainly inhabits woodlands along rivers, forest edges and flower-rich grasslands.

Description
 The adults can reach  of length. The basic coloration of the body is pale green, with a reddish-brown streak on the back. The legs are mainly green, with pale brown knees. The antennae are brown and very long. Ovipositor is quite short. Elytra of females are green, while in males they show a white outer edge, with a dark brown band on the edge. Metaplastes pulchripennis is quite similar to Barbistes species, but it can be distinguished by the cerci of the males and the more elongated pronotum.

Biology
It can commonly be encountered from June through July, especially on Cistus  and Rubus species.

References

 Paolo Fontana, Baudewijn Odé & Bruno Massa. 2004 – Sull’identità di Metaplastes ippolitoi e le altre specie del genere Metaplastes - (Orthoptera Tettigoniidae). Memorie Soc. entomol. Ital., (2003)

Phaneropterinae
Insects described in 1863
Taxa named by Achille Costa
Orthoptera of Europe